In 2005, Oregon had success behind senior quarterback Kellen Clemens and a new spread offense. During a game at Arizona, Clemens suffered a broken ankle. At that point Oregon was 8-1 (their only loss was to #1 ranked USC 45-13, the loss was vacated in 2010), and still in the hunt for a BCS game. Oregon won their final three games and their success led them into contention for a bid to the Fiesta Bowl.  The Ducks finished the regular season with a 10-1 record, their best finish since their Joey Harrington-led, Fiesta Bowl-winning 2001–2002 team.  They finished 5th overall in the BCS ranking system, which would in many years have been high enough to earn them a bid to a BCS Bowl.  In 2005, however, there were no at-large bids available to Oregon. Ohio State finished just ahead of the Ducks, in 4th place, guaranteeing them one of the at-large berths (although they had an inferior 10-2 record). Notre Dame finished 6th in the BCS, also securing a BCS bid due to a pre-existing clause in the BCS contract. Many college football fans were outraged that two teams with worse records were selected over the Ducks. Moreover, for the second consecutive year, the Pac-10 conference had a team that finished with a one-loss season snubbed by the BCS (the Cal Bears finished 10-1 in 2004). It was later demonstrated that Oregon drew the highest bowl ratings in college football, calling the argument that TV ratings hurt the Ducks' BCS chances into question.  The situation (and others like it in recent years) has led to more calls for a playoff system to replace the BCS, which has received widespread criticism from college football fans.  Instead of a BCS game, they were assigned to the 2005 Holiday Bowl versus the Oklahoma Sooners. Playing without their starting quarterback, Kellen Clemens, and combined with a strong showing from the Sooners, the Ducks fell in a close game, 17-14.

Before the season

Recruiting

Schedule

Game summaries

Stanford

Source: ESPN

References

Oregon
Oregon Ducks football seasons
Oregon Ducks football